Phlyctaeniidae is an extinct family of placoderm fishes that lived during the Devonian period, mainly in Norway and North America.

Phylogeny
ORDER ARTHRODIRA
 Infraorder Actinolepina
 Family Actinolepidae
 Suborder Phlyctaenioidei
 Family Holonematidae
 Infraorder Phlyctaeniina
 Family Groenlandaspididae
 Family Phlyctaeniidae

References
 

 
Placoderm families